Buglio is an Italian surname. Notable people with the surname include:

Davide Buglio (born 1998), Italian footballer
Francesco Buglio (born 1957), Italian footballer
Lodovico Buglio (1606–1682), Italian Jesuit mathematician and theologian

Italian-language surnames